The following is a list of licensed FM/AM radio stations in the city of Turin, Italy sorted by frequency.

See also 
 List of radio stations in Italy
 List of radio stations in Rome
 List of radio stations in Naples

Turin
Radio stations
Radio stations